Thomas W. Commeraw (–1823), also known erronously as Thomas H. Commereau, was an early 19th century African-American potter and businessman.

Name 
An exhibition of early American pottery in 1931 presented a “Commeraw Stoneware Jug.”  Although the catalogue did not yet reflect the erroneous spelling of “Commereau” that would become popular with later pottery catalogues, such as Ketchum's important record of New York potters, it also did not mention the ethnicity of Commeraw, leaving the reader to assume that he was an American of European ancestry, like the rest of the potters documented in the catalogue.  The later misspelling “Commereau,” found copied in the museum records of Winterthur and numerous other institutions, likely stems from an 1800 census that listed “Commeraw /a Black/” living in New York's Seventh Ward.    The cursive handwriting could easily be misread as Commereau, sparking a series of authors and museums to first assume a French-African identity, and later a French identity, as the newer sources referred to previous books and lost the original census referent. With only the French name Commereau to go by, it made sense for museums to assume a European identity for the potter who worked in a European style. This simple misspelling shaped the way Commeraw was interpreted and understood for decades.

Career 
Commeraw was an African-American ceramist producing ceramics in early-19th-century New York working between 1797 and 1819. He operated a ceramics business on the Lower East Side waterfront on Corlears Hook. Commeraw's work was known for its painted blue tassels, scallops, and petals. Commeraw's containers were used in many ways including holding a variety of products including oysters, preserved fruit and alcohol.

In 1819, Cornelius I. Bogert successfully sued Thomas W. Commeraw and his second wife Ann (his first wife Mary had died of dysentery in 1813) in the New York Court of Chancery, the predecessor to the state supreme court. In a series of newspaper articles in the Evening Post in June of that year, the court advertised the auction of two lots of land owned by Commeraw between Cherry Street and Lombardy street, where his pottery kiln and business was located.

In 1820, he left the United States to travel with the American Colonization Society to Sierra Leone. In the new colony, Commeraw was a leader, writing letters back to the Society to report on the state of the project. One of these letters was published in The National Advocate in 1820. The letter describes Sierra Leone as rich and fertile and is ultimately hopeful about the fledgling colony.  Nonetheless, the Society maintained control over the colony in a manner that took away some of Commeraw's freedoms. They forced Commeraw and his comrades to move in 1821, believing that the British government may attempt to take the previous site, consisting of valuable farmland, away from the vulnerable colonists.  Commeraw lost his wife in the journey, a devastating loss for a man with three young children.  In that year, Commeraw wrote another letter to the Society, in which he despaired of the project and feared for his children's moral state.  He quickly left, returning to the United States after only two years abroad. 

Commeraw's works are in these collections: Metropolitan Museum of Art, Brooklyn Museum, National Museum of American History, The Winterthur Museum of Art, New-York Historical Society, Grolier Club, the Baltimore Museum of Art and the New York City Archaeological Repository.

In 2022, Commeraw's work was included in the exhibition Before Yesterday We Could Fly at the Metropolitan Museum of Art. In 2023, Commeraw will be the subject of Crafting Freedom at the New-York Historical Society, the first single-artist show to be dedicated to him.

Style 
Commeraw's work is in a German style of stoneware brought to New York by the Crolius and Remmey families. Johan Willem Crolius came to New York from a small town near Westerwald, the center of eighteenth-century German stoneware production. Johannes Remmey came from the same region, and they married sisters, forming an interconnected family of potters that dominated the stoneware production in New York for decades. This family established the first pottery kiln in New York on Pottbaker's Hill.  There, they continued the German stoneware tradition of their home country, creating works with a salt-glaze, cobalt blue paint, and incised floral details, just as Commeraw would later create. Crolius's pottery kiln was less than a twenty-minute walk away from the slave market in New York City, providing Crolius with a potential source of inexpensive labor for his workshop. Crolius had at least five enslaved people at the time of his death, but may have had many more. Some of these enslaved individuals would have been used as labor in the pottery business, trained in the German style of pottery that the Remmey-Crolius family was known for. It was common for white contractors to use enslaved people as apprentices.  Enslaved individuals trained in a crucial business function were often more valuable than their untrained counterparts, and were not traded and sold as frequently.

Many of his works are inscribed with a location, either N*York (short for New York) or Corlear's Hook, the neighborhood of New York where they were created. Examples of Commeraw's work are also collected by the Metropolitan Museum in New York City and the Smithsonian National Museum of American History.  Many more of his jars are sold on the antique market between private collectors. Twenty-three jars attributed to Commeraw were sold by the pottery auction house Crocker's Farm between 2009 and 2017.  Of these, only five do not display Commeraw's maker's mark. Three of those five are in Commeraw's style, with the incised floral design characteristic of his early work. The other two are oyster jars made for Dave Johnson, an African-American merchant.  The pieces marked by Commeraw as his own are mostly of the storage jar shape.

References

External links 

 The Thomas Commeraw Project
 Mark Shapiro on 19th Century Potter Thomas Commeraw - podcast

American potters
19th-century African-American people
19th-century American artists
American ceramists
African-American ceramists
African-American potters
Artists from New York City